Elusa antennata is a species of moth of the family Noctuidae. It was described by Frederic Moore in 1882. It is found in the north-eastern Himalaya.

References

Moths described in 1882
Hadeninae
Moths of Asia